Ross Corners Christian Academy (RCCA) is an independent private Christian school located in Vestal, New York. It holds grades Preschool through 12th. It is open to all students, even non-Christians. Its colors are blue and white, and their mascot is a ram.

History
The Christian Elementary School opened its doors in September, 1960 to fifty-five pupils, from kindergarten to grade four. In 1961, preschool, as well as grades five and six were added, and plans were made to add one more grade each year through the twelfth grade. In 1965, a ground breaking ceremony was held for the building of the gymnasium. It was completed in September 1966.

The belief statement of the school is written from a fundamentalist and literalist viewpoint.

Services
Basketball and Soccer Teams
School Band
Music Class
Art Class
Gym
Chess Club
Speech Club
P-12th Grade
Drama Guild
Student Council
Chapel
Office

References

External links

Educational Video

Baptist schools in the United States
Christian schools in New York (state)
Private elementary schools in New York (state)
Private high schools in Broome County, New York
Private middle schools in New York (state)
Educational institutions established in 1960
1960 establishments in New York (state)